This article is a complete list of seasons completed by the Ottawa Redblacks. The Redblacks have played in the Canadian Football League (CFL) since 2014.

 
Ottawa Redblacks Seasons